Peter Storm is an outdoor clothing brand developed in the United Kingdom. It was originally created in 1954 by former Royal Marine Noel Bibby as a company supplying waterproof nylon rainwear. 

Bibby was credited with inventing the cagoule. 

After Bibby's death in 1989, the British rights to the name were bought by Blacks Leisure Group, subsequently acquired by JD Sports, and Peter Storm branded clothes are now sold mainly through its chains of Blacks and Millets and Tiso shops. A different line of clothing is sold internationally under the Peter Storm name by Outdoor Equipment.

References

External links
 International line website

Clothing companies of the United Kingdom
British brands
Outdoor clothing brands